The Parliamentary Assembly of the Council of Europe (PACE) is the parliamentary arm of the Council of Europe, a 46-nation international organisation dedicated to upholding human rights, democracy and the rule of law.

The Assembly is made up of 306 members drawn from the national parliaments of the Council of Europe's member states, and generally meets four times a year for week-long plenary sessions in Strasbourg.

It is one of the two statutory bodies of the Council of Europe, along with the Committee of Ministers, the executive body representing governments, with which it holds an ongoing dialogue. However, it is the Assembly which is usually regarded as the "motor" of the organisation, holding governments to account on human rights issues, pressing states to maintain democratic standards, proposing fresh ideas and generating the momentum for reform.

The Assembly held its first session in Strasbourg on 10 August 1949, embodying at that time the hopes of many Europeans who, in the aftermath of World War II, saw European unity as the best way of preventing a return to the devastation of war, a "safety net" to prevent gross human rights violations such as the horrors of The Holocaust, and a democratic bulwark against tyranny.

Among the Assembly's main achievements are:
 ending the death penalty in Europe by requiring new member states to stop all executions;
 making possible, and providing a blueprint for, the European Convention on Human Rights;
 high-profile reports exposing violations of human rights in Council of Europe member states;
 assisting former Soviet countries to embrace democracy after 1989;
 inspiring and helping to shape many progressive new national laws; and
 helping member states to overcome conflict or reach consensus on divisive political or social issues.

Powers 

Unlike the European Parliament (an institution of the European Union), the Assembly does not have the power to create binding laws. However, it speaks on behalf of 700 million Europeans and has the power to:
 demand action from the 46 Council of Europe governments, who – acting through the organisation's executive body – must jointly reply
 probe human rights violations in any of the member states
 question Prime Ministers and Heads of State on any subject
 send parliamentarians to observe elections and mediate over crises
 set the terms on which states may join the Council of Europe, through its power of veto
 inspire, propose and help to shape new national laws
 request legal evaluations of the laws and constitutions of member states
 sanction a member state by recommending its exclusion or suspension
Important statutory functions of PACE are the election of the judges of the European Court of Human Rights, the Council of Europe's Commissioner for Human Rights and its Secretary General, as well as the members of the Committee for the Prevention of Torture.

In general the Assembly meets four times per year in Strasbourg at the Palace of Europe for week-long plenary sessions. The nine permanent committees of the Assembly meet all year long to prepare reports and draft resolutions in their respective fields of expertise.

The Assembly sets its own agenda, but its debates and reports are primarily focused on the Council of Europe's three core statutory aims, defending human rights, promoting democracy and upholding the rule of law.

Election of judges to the European Court of Human Rights
Judges of the European Court of Human Rights are elected by PACE from a list of three candidates nominated by each member state which has ratified the European Convention on Human Rights. A 20-member committee made up of parliamentarians with legal experience – meeting in camera – interviews all candidates for judge on the Court and assesses their CVs before making recommendations to the full Assembly, which elects one judge from each shortlist in a secret vote. Judges are elected for a period of nine years and may not be re-elected.

Although the European Convention does not, in itself, require member states to present a multi-sex shortlist of potential appointees, in a 2004 resolution PACE decided that it "will not consider lists of candidates where the list does not include at least one candidate of each sex" unless there are exceptional circumstances. As a result, around one-third of the current bench of 46 judges are women, making the Court a leader among international courts on gender balance.

Achievements

Birthplace of the European Convention on Human Rights 
At its very first meeting, in the summer of 1949, the Parliamentary Assembly adopted the essential blueprint of what became the European Convention on Human Rights, selecting which rights should be protected and defining the outline of the judicial mechanism to enforce them. Its detailed proposal, with some changes, was eventually adopted by the Council of Europe's ministerial body, and entered into force in 1953. Today, seventy years later, the European Court of Human Rights – given shape and form during the Assembly's historic post-war debates – is regarded as a global standard-bearer for justice, protecting the rights of citizens in 46 European nations and beyond, and paving the way for the gradual convergence of human rights laws and practice across the continent. The Assembly continues to elect the judges of the Court.

Originator of the European flag and anthem 
The Assembly was at the origin of both the Flag of Europe, the twelve yellow stars on a blue background, and the Anthem of Europe, an arrangement of Ludwig van Beethoven's Ode to Joy. Having been proposed by the Assembly, both were adopted firstly by the Council of Europe, and - several years later - by the European Union. Both are now known worldwide as symbols of Europe. Various proposals for a flag were submitted to the Council of Europe in the early 1950s and on 25 September 1953 the Assembly officially adopted a version with fifteen stars, which represented the number of Council of Europe member states at the time. However "a difficulty arose" in the Council of Europe's ministerial body over the number of stars after West Germany objected that one was for the Saarland region, which was then under French control and did not rejoin Germany until 1957. It would have agreed to fourteen stars, but this was in turn unacceptable to France. Two years later, after further consultations, the twelve-star version was unanimously approved by both bodies of the Council of Europe. The institutions of the European Union began using the flag in 1986. After many early discussions, "Ode to Joy" was proposed by PACE as an official European anthem on 8 July 1971, and formally adopted by the Council of Europe in 1972, before being taken up by the EU in 1985.

Ending the death penalty in Europe 
In 1973 Swedish PACE member Astrid Bergegren first put forward a motion inviting member states to abolish the death penalty. Momentum built in the following years, and by 1980 the Assembly was calling on Europe's parliaments to abolish it, and insisting that the "right to life" included in the European Convention on Human Rights implied a ban on state killing. In 1989 the Assembly took the decision to make ending executions a condition of Council of Europe membership - just before a wave of central and eastern European nations joined the organisation. Today, the death penalty has been abolished in law in all 46 member states in peacetime, though some continue to allow it in time of war. Though rare calls are occasionally heard for its reintroduction, abolition continent-wide is now regarded as a major achievement of the Council of Europe as a whole, and it now joins others in pressing for abolition worldwide.

Support for emerging democracies 
Over the decades, the Assembly has been at the forefront of supporting democratic change in successive waves of European nations at key moments in their history, negotiating their entry into the Council of Europe "club of democracies" (as the Assembly has a veto on any new member joining the organisation, it has used this power to negotiate with applicant countries the conditions on which they join). In the 1950s it led the way in embracing recently defeated Germany, in the 1960s it took a strong stand during the Greek crisis, and in the 1970s it welcomed post-Franco Spain and Portugal into the democratic fold. Above all, it played a key role after the fall of the Iron Curtain in 1989, creating a path towards membership for former Communist countries with its "Special Guest status", paving the way for the historic reconciliation of European nations under one roof.

Exposing torture in CIA secret prisons in Europe 
In two reports for the Assembly in 2006 and 2007, Swiss Senator and former Prosecutor Dick Marty revealed convincing evidence that terror suspects were being transported to, held and tortured in CIA-run "secret prisons" on European soil. The evidence in his first report in 2006 – gathered with the help of investigative journalists and plane-spotters among others – suggested that a number of Council of Europe member states had permitted CIA "rendition flights" across their airspace, enabling the secret transfer of terror suspects without any legal rights. In a second report in 2007, Marty showed how two member states – Poland and Romania – had allowed "secret prisons" to be established on their territory, where torture took place. His main conclusions – subsequently confirmed in a series of rulings by the European Court of Human Rights, as well as a comprehensive US Senate report – threw the first real light on a dark chapter in US and European history in the aftermath of the 11 September attacks, kicked off a series of national probes, and helped to make torture on European soil less likely.

Sanctions against the Russian delegation, and eventual expulsion

In April 2014, after the Russian parliament's backing for the annexation of Crimea and Russo-Ukrainian War, the Assembly decided to suspend the Russian delegation's voting rights as well as the right of Russian members to be represented in the Assembly's leading bodies and to participate in election observation missions. However, the Russian delegation remained members of the Assembly. The sanction applied throughout the remainder of the 2014 session and was renewed for a full year in January 2015, lapsing in January 2016. The sanction applied only to Russian parliamentarians in PACE, the Council of Europe's parliamentary body, and Russia continued to be a full member of the organisation as a whole.

In response, the Russian parliamentary delegation suspended its co-operation with PACE in June 2014, and in January 2016 – despite the lapsing of the sanctions – the Russian parliament decided not to submit its delegation's credentials for ratification, effectively leaving its seats empty. It did so again in January 2017, January 2018 and January 2019.

On 25 June 2019, after an eight-hour debate which ended in the small hours, the Assembly voted to change its rules, to make clear that its members should always have the right "to vote, to speak and to be represented", acceding to a key Russian demand and paving the way for the return of a Russian parliamentary delegation. Within hours the Russian parliament had presented the credentials of a new delegation, which – despite being challenged – were approved without any sanction by a vote of 116 in favour, 62 against and 15 abstentions. As a result, the Russian delegation which included Pyotr Olegovich Tolstoy as its head returned to PACE with its full rights after a gap of five years. In response, the Ukrainian delegation protested before the Assembly, and announced Ukraine would leave the institution. Ukraine returned to PACE in January 2020.

Following its invasion of Ukraine on 24 February 2022, Russia's membership in the Council of Europe was suspended by 
the Council of Europe's ministerial body, having consulted the Assembly on 25 February 2022.

On 15 March, following an all-day debate at an Extraordinary Session, the Parliamentary Assembly adopted a resolution calling on the Council of Europe's ministerial body to go further and to "immediately" expel Russia from the Council because of its aggression against Ukraine. It is the first time in its history that the Assembly has made such a call. As the debate was drawing to a close, Russia submitted a formal letter announcing that it was withdrawing from the Council; however the debate continued and - in a unanimous vote of 216 in favour, 0 against and 3 abstentions - the Assembly called for Russia's expulsion. The following day, 16 March, at an extraordinary meeting, the Committee of Ministers of the Council of Europe decided that Russia should cease to be a member from that same day, after 26 years as a member state.

In October 2022, because of recent nuclear threats made by Moscow, the Council of Europe adopted a resolution declaring Russia a "terrorist" regime.

Historic speeches 
In 2018 an online archive of all speeches made to the Parliamentary Assembly by heads of state or government since its creation in 1949 appeared on the Assembly's website, the fruit of the two-year project entitled "Voices of Europe". At the time of its launch, the archive comprised 263 speeches delivered over a 70-year period by some 216 Presidents, Prime Ministers, monarchs and religious leaders from 45 countries, but it continues to expand, as new speeches are added every few months.

Some very early speeches by individuals considered to be "founding figures" of the European institutions, even if they were not heads of state or government at the time, are also included (such as those by Winston Churchill and Robert Schuman). Addresses by eight monarchs appear in the list (such as King Juan Carlos I of Spain, King Albert II of Belgium and Grand Duke Henri of Luxembourg) as well as the speeches given by religious figures (such as Pope John Paul II) and several leaders from countries in the Middle East and North Africa (such as Shimon Peres, Yasser Arafat, Hosni Mubarak, Léopold Sédar Senghor or King Hussein of Jordan).

The full text of the speeches is given in both English and French, regardless of the original language used. The archive is searchable by country, by name, and chronologically.

Languages 
The official languages of the Council of Europe are English and French, but the Assembly also uses German and Italian as working languages. Each parliamentarian has separate earphones and a desk on which they are able to select the language which they would like to listen to. When foreign guests wish to address the Assembly in languages other than its working languages, they are invited to bring their own interpreters.

Controversies

Alleged corruption 
In 2013, The New York Times reported that "some council members, notably Central Asian states and Russia, have tried to influence the organisation's parliamentary assembly with lavish gifts and trips". According to the report, said member states also hire lobbyists to fend off criticism of their human rights records. German news magazine Der Spiegel had earlier revealed details about the strategies of Azerbaijan's government to influence the voting behaviour of selected members of the Parliamentary Assembly.

In January 2017, following a series of critical reports on "caviar diplomacy" by the European Stability Initiative (ESI) NGO, and concern expressed by many members of the Assembly, the Assembly's Bureau decided to set up an independent, external body to investigate these allegations of corruption. In May 2017, three distinguished former judges were named to conduct the investigation: Sir Nicolas Bratza, a British former President of the European Court of Human Rights; Jean-Louis Bruguière, a French former anti-terrorist judge and investigator; and Elisabet Fura, a former Swedish parliamentary Ombudsman and judge on the Strasbourg Court. There are no other known examples in recent history of an international organisation setting up an independent, external anti-corruption probe into itself.

The investigation body, which was invited to carry out its task "in the utmost confidence", appealed for anyone with information relevant to its mandate to come forward, and held a series of hearings with witnesses. The investigation body's final report was published on 22 April 2018 after nine months of work, finding "strong suspicions of corruptive conduct involving members of the Assembly" and naming a number of members and former members as having breached the Assembly's Code of Conduct.

The Assembly responded by declaring, in a resolution, "zero tolerance for corruption". Following a series of hearings, it sanctioned many of the members or former members mentioned in the Investigative Body's report, either by depriving them of certain rights, or by excluding them from the Assembly's premises for life. It also undertook a major overhaul of its integrity framework and Code of Conduct.

Resolution on children's right to physical integrity

In October 2013, following a motion by the Committee on Social Affairs, Health and Sustainable Development a year prior, the Assembly passed a resolution and an accompanying recommendation on children's right to physical integrity. These documents argued that while PACE had addressed forms of child abuse such as sexual violence and domestic violence, it was also necessary to address what they called "non-medically justified violations of children's physical integrity which may have a long-lasting impact on their lives". They called for a ban on the most harmful practices, such as female genital mutilation, while also calling for increased dialogue on other procedures they viewed as harmful, such as infant male circumcision, intersex medical interventions, and body piercings.

While none of the above documents called for an outright ban on male circumcision, they did call for the procedure to be regulated and debated, and an accompanying report referred to the practice as a "human rights violation". This condemnation received criticism from religious groups and figures, such as  Shimon Peres, the president of Israel at the time, as well as the Anti-Defamation League, which argued that circumcision was an accepted medical procedure and that the resolution interfered with religious freedom and was anti-Semitic. In response to these criticisms, Liliane Maury Pasquier of the Committee on Social Affairs, Health and Sustainable Development wrote an op-ed in The Washington Post arguing that medical evidence against circumcision was presented in the Assembly's hearings and that the child's right to physical integrity overrode the parents' right to religious freedom. This op-ed was further criticized by the Anti-Defamation League.

In 2015, PACE passed a resolution on religious freedom and tolerance that referenced its previous resolution on circumcision and reiterated its view that the procedure should only be performed under appropriate medical conditions. Though some outlets reported that PACE had retracted its anti-circumcision stance, PACE clarified that it had neither cancelled nor replaced the old resolution and that they had never called for infant circumcision to be banned in the first place.

Cultural divisions 
Although the Council of Europe is a human rights watchdog and a guardian against discrimination, it is widely regarded as becoming increasingly divided on moral issues because its membership includes mainly Muslim countries (Turkey and Azerbaijan) as well as Eastern European countries, among them Russia, where social conservatism is strong. In 2007, this became evident when the Parliamentary Assembly voted on a report compiled by Anne Brasseur of the Alliance of Liberals and Democrats for Europe Party on the rise of Christian creationism, bolstered by right-wing and populist parties in Eastern Europe.

Participants 
The Assembly has a total of 612 members in total – 306 principal members and 306 substitutes – who are appointed or elected by the parliaments of each member state. Delegations must reflect the balance in the national parliament, so contain members of both ruling parties and oppositions. The population of each country determines its number of representatives and number of votes. This is in contrast to the Committee of Ministers, the Council of Europe's executive body, where each country has one vote. While not full members, the parliaments of Kyrgyzstan, Jordan, Morocco and Palestine hold "Partner for Democracy" status with the Assembly – which allows their delegations to take part in the Assembly's work, but without the right to vote – and there are also observer delegates from the Canadian, Israeli and Mexican parliaments.

The costs of participation in the Assembly – mainly travel and accommodation expenses – are borne by the national parliament of the delegation concerned. The few members who are appointed as rapporteurs, when they are carrying out work for the Assembly, have their costs covered by the Council of Europe.

Some notable former members of PACE include:
 former heads of state or government such as Britain's wartime leader Sir Winston Churchill, former German Chancellor Helmut Kohl, former Italian Prime Minister Silvio Berlusconi, former Turkish President Abdullah Gül, former Cypriot President Glafcos Clerides, former Finnish President Tarja Halonen, former Georgian President Mikhail Saakashvili, former Albanian President Sali Berisha, and many others.
 Dick Marty (Switzerland), appointed in late 2005 as rapporteur to investigate the CIA extraordinary renditions scandal and organ theft in Kosovo by the Kosovo Liberation Army from the Kosovo war, in 1998–2001
 A number of leading British political personalities, including former Deputy Prime Minister John Prescott, former Liberal Democrat leader Charles Kennedy, former Labour leader Jeremy Corbyn, and former Scottish First Minister Alex Salmond.
 Marcello Dell'Utri (Italy), convicted for complicity in conspiracy with the Mafia, a crime for which he was found guilty on appeal and sentenced to 7 years in 2010.
 the Scottish soldier, adventurer, writer and MP Sir Fitzroy Maclean (United Kingdom), author of the autobiographical memoir and travelogue Eastern Approaches, who was a member of PACE on two separate occasions, in 1951–1952 and 1972–1973.

Composition by parliamentary delegation

Notes

The special guest status of the National Assembly of Belarus was suspended on 13 January 1997.

The Russian Federation ceased to be a member of the Council of Europe on 16 March 2022.

Parliaments with Partner for Democracy status 

Parliaments with Partner for Democracy status, pledge to work towards certain basic values of the Council of Europe, and agree to occasional assessments of their progress. In return, they are able to send delegations to take part in the work of the Assembly and its committees, but without the right to vote.

Parliaments with observer status

Other delegations 
The Assembly of Kosovo has been invited to designate a delegation to take part in the work of the Assembly and its committees, but without the right to vote. All references to Kosovo and its institutions within the work of the assembly are without prejudice to the status of Kosovo.

Invited representatives 
Two representatives of the Turkish Cypriot community have been invited to participate in the deliberations of the assembly.

Composition by political group 
The Assembly has six political groups.

Presidents 

The Presidents of the Parliamentary Assembly of the Council of Europe have been:

Vice-Presidents

Secretary General

In January 2021 the Assembly elected Despina Chatzivassiliou-Tsovilis as Secretary General of the Assembly, serving a five-year term beginning in March 2021.

She heads an 80-strong multi-national secretariat based in Strasbourg, and is the first woman to hold the post since the Assembly's creation in 1949, as well as the first person of Greek nationality.

See also 
 European Cultural Convention
 Václav Havel Human Rights Prize

References

Further reading 
  Le Conseil de l'Europe, Jean-Louis Burban, publisher PUF, collection « Que sais-je ? », n° 885.

External links 
 

 
Politics of Europe
International organizations based in Europe
Organizations based in Strasbourg
Organizations established in 1949
1949 establishments in Europe